St Anne's GAA is a Gaelic Athletic Association club located in Rathangan, County Wexford, Ireland. The club fields teams in Men's and Ladies Gaelic football and hurling.
The St Anne's club has been active, in different forms and names, since the beginning of the GAA in 1884. It originally took the name of Kilmannon in 1886 and down through the years had the names of Brownstown, Baldwinstown, Duncormick, Cleariestown, Redmoor and Scar representing the parish, sometimes even against one another. The name St Anne's was first mooted in the parish in 1932 and with a few brief exceptions that name has stayed with the club ever since.

Adult success was scarce enough until in 1966, when we won the junior football county title followed by the senior in 1968. This was helped greatly by the amalgamation with Kilmore in underage and all the success that it brought. Our own single parish successes in underage in the eighties and nineties in hurling and football culminated in the great senior double in 2000 and a senior football title in 2001.

The present club has changed greatly, for the better, in the last 20 years with the great club development in buildings, pitches and the new hurling facilities which the people of the parish have stood strongly behind with financial and general support. The whole community is now involved and the ladies football and camogie teams have enhanced the club even further. An active parish is a happy parish and long may it remain so.

The youth is much more involved now looking after the many underage teams in all grades and as experienced in the very successful Walkathon in Summer 2017 which encompassed mental health also. The schools had always played their part in Gaelic games in the parish and with the amalgamation of the four of them in 1971 it got even better culminating in several Rackard league victories in both codes leading to even more senior titles in football in 2012 and 2014.

February 2018 the history of the GAA in the parish, all 133 years of it, aptly named "October 2000" was launched, in a 516 page book, in the GAA centre.

In 2019, St Anne's started playing rounders at underage and entered both boys' and girls' rounders teams in the All-Ireland Feile in Cork.

Honours
 Wexford Senior Hurling Championship (2): 1924, 2000
 Wexford Senior Football Championship (5): 1968, 2000, 2001, 2012, 2014
 Wexford Senior Ladies Football Championship (1): 2017
 Wexford Intermediate Ladies Football Championship (1) 2012
 Wexford Intermediate Football Championship (1): 1990, 2020
 Wexford Intermediate Hurling Championship (2): 1999, 2017
 Wexford Junior Football Championship (1): 1966
 Wexford Junior Hurling Championship (3): 1924, 1977, 1996
 Wexford Junior Ladies Football Championship (1) 2011
 Wexford Junior B Camogie Championship 2018
 Wexford Junior C Camogie Championship 2010
 Wexford Under-21 Football Championship (1): 1971
 Wexford Under-21 Hurling Championship (1): 2011
 Wexford Minor Football Championship (1): 2008

Notable players

 Jack Berry
 Darragh Ryan (hurler)
 David O’Connor
 Fiona Rochford
 Marica Cullen
 Fiona Bennett
 Diarmuid O'Keeffe
 Redmond Barry (sportsman)
 Liam Óg McGovern

References

Other sources

Gaelic games clubs in County Wexford
Hurling clubs in County Wexford
Gaelic football clubs in County Wexford